Léo Coly (born 9 September 1999) is a French rugby union player. His position is scrum-half and he currently plays for Montpellier in the Top 14.

References

External links
France profile at FFR
Montpellier profile
L'Équipe profile

1999 births
Living people
People from Rennes
Sportspeople from Ille-et-Vilaine
French rugby union players
Stade Montois players
Montpellier Hérault Rugby players
Rugby union scrum-halves